Łukasz Kubot and Oliver Marach won the final 6–2, 7–6(3) in the final against Johan Brunström and Jean-Julien Rojer.

Seeds

Draw

Draw

External links
Doubles Draw

Doubles